The Jane Show is a Canadian television sitcom produced by Shaftesbury Films that was shown on Global from 2006 to 2007.  The series stars Teresa Pavlinek as Jane Black, an aspiring novelist who takes a corporate job after her life undergoes a major upheaval.

Pavlinek was also a co-creator, producer and writer for the series, alongside Ralph Chapman.

The show's cast also included Patricia Zentilli, Darren Boyd, Kate Trotter, Hardee T. Lineham, Nigel Shawn Williams and Andrew Misle.

Global originally aired the series pilot in December 2004, but retooled and redeveloped the program before ordering more episodes, which aired in 2006.  The second season aired in 2007.  The show was officially cancelled by Global on June 28, 2007.

Awards
In 2007, both Ralph Chapman and Teresa Pavlinek were nominated for WGC awards for the episodes "Should Have Said" and "All About Steve", respectively.

Episodes
episode 0 "Pilot" 15 December 2004

Season 1
The End Is the Beginning 1 June 2006
Let the Games Begin 6 June 2006
Jane's Addiction 20 June 2006
Ode to Marian 22 June 2006
Daddy's Home 29 June 2006
Tasting 5 July 2006
Thursday Night Rules 13 July 2006
Close Friends 20 July 2006
Should Have Said 27 July 2006
Strictly Jane aired 3 August 2006
All About Steve 10 August 2006
Rules of Engagement 17 August 2006
Evaluating Jane 24 August 2006

Season 2
episode 14 Movin' on Up
episode 15 Blog Like Me 2 February 2007
episode 16 A Jane in the Crowd
episode 17 Shower Killer (featuring Anna Silk as Kathy)
episode 18: title of episode 5 unknown
episode 19 The House of Jane 14 March 2007
episode 20 Voices from the Past 15 January 2007
episode 21 The United Nations of Jane 22 February 2007
episode 22 Plastic Ono Jane
episode 23 The Chosen One 4 April 2007
episode 24 Walton Returns 11 April 2007
episode 25 It's All Relative 18 April 2007
episode 26 Till Beth Do Us Part 25 April 2007
episode 27 Who's Got Spirit? 6 May 2007

References

External links
 

Global Television Network original programming
2007 Canadian television series endings
Television series by Shaftesbury Films
2004 Canadian television series debuts
Television shows filmed in Toronto
2000s Canadian sitcoms
2000s Canadian workplace comedy television series